Cross of Honour/Honor or Honour/Honor Cross may refer to:

Badge of Honour of the Bundeswehr, military medal of the Federal Republic of Germany
Bundeswehr Cross of Honour for Valour, military medal of the Federal Republic of Germany
Civil Defence Cross of Honour, Norwegian medal for civil defence personnel
Cross of Honour, alternative title of the 2012 film Into the White
Cross of Honour of the Abbot of Lilienfeld, honour of the Lilienfeld Abbey, Catholic Church in Austria, founded in 1980
Cross of Honour of the German Mother, civil state decoration of the German Reich
Cross of Honour for Military Service Abroad, Belgian military medal for overseas service
Cross of Honour for Science and Art, divisions of the Austrian Decoration for Science and Art
Defence Cross of Honour, civil medal awarded for assisting Norwegian defence forces
European Policeman Cross of Honor, honorary medal of the European association of the Bodies and Public Organisms of Security and of Defense
Honour Cross of the World War 1914 - 1918, German First World War service medal
Police Cross of Honour, civil medal awarded for assisting Norwegian police
Southern Cross of Honor, United Daughters of the Confederacy commemorative medal presented to United Confederate Veterans